OMR is a contemporary art gallery located in Mexico City.

History 
OMR was founded in 1983 by its principals Patricia Ortiz Monasterio and Jaime Riestra The gallery is located in the Roma district which is now recognized as the leading art scene area in Mexico City The Observer wrote in August 2019 that OMR is "one of the city’s longest-running and largest blue-chip galleries" and noted that the majority of their buyers are "foreign collectors"

The gallery represents emerging and established contemporary artists, and it is the exclusive representative of the estates of Adolfo Riestra and Luis Ortiz Monasterio, and Alberto Gironella. Since its beginning, OMR has been a major influence on the arts in Mexico, showing avant-garde artists that have now become some of the referential points of the Mexican art scene.

Among the fairs in which the gallery participates are Frieze Los Angeles  Zona MACO (Mexico) Art Basel (Switzerland), Art Brussels (Belgium) and Art Basel Miami (USA). In 2009, OMR opened a project space for young artists in an annex called 'el52'

References

External links
 OMR

Contemporary art galleries in Mexico
Art galleries established in 1983
1983 establishments in Mexico